Basum (autonym: brag gsum 'three cliffs'; Basong 巴松话; Bake) is a divergent Bodish language spoken by about 2,500 people in Gongbo'gyamda County 工布江达县, Nyingtri Prefecture, Tibet, China. Basum is spoken by 13.5% of the population of Gongbo'gyamda County. Glottolog lists Basum as unclassified within Bodish.

Basum is spoken in Cuogao Township 错高乡 and Xueka Township 雪卡乡 of Gongbo'gyamda County 工布江达县, Nyingtri Prefecture, Tibet, China (Qu, et al. 1989).

Classification

Qu, et al. (1989) notes that Basum is mutually unintelligible with and quite different from Gongbu Tibetan (11,600 speakers), which is a Central Tibetan language variety closely related to Nyingchi Tibetan. Basum is also unintelligible with Niangpu 娘蒲话 (also called Muqu 牧区话), which is a Khams Tibetan language variety spoken by 4,310 people in Jiaxing 加兴 and Niangpu 娘蒲 townships of Gongbo'gyamda County. Qu, et al. (1989:61) notices some lexical similarities between Basum and Cuona Menba (Tawang Monpa), an East Bodish language.

Suzuki & Nyima (2016) consider Basum to be a non-Tibetic language.

Tournadre (2014) classifies Basum (Bake) as an unclassified Bodish language that does not belong to the Tibetic branch. Tournadre (2014: 112) notes that Basum has the negator a-, as opposed to the negator ma- or myi- in Tibetic languages. Also, unlike Tibetic languages, Basum does not palatalize Proto-Bodish *ti- and *si-.

A computational phylogenetic of various languages of Tibet by Jiang (2022) shows that Basum is divergent, and although it shows some similarities with the Medog dialect of Khams Tibetan due to contact, as well as with East Bodish ("Menba" or "Monpa") languages.

Lexicon
Qu, et al. (1989: 50–51) list the following Basum words with no cognates in neighboring Tibetic languages.

Other divergent Basum words are (Suzuki & Nyima 2016):

References

Qu, Aitang and Gong, Que and Yi, Xi and Jie, Ang 瞿霭堂; 共确; 益西; 结昂. 1989. Wèi cáng fāngyán de xīn tŭŭ: Bāsōng huà 卫藏方言的新土语——记最近发现的巴松话. Minzu Yuwen 3. 39–61.

Languages of Tibet
Unclassified Sino-Tibetan languages
Nyingchi